A roads may be
motorways or freeways, usually where the local word for motorway begins with A (for example, Autobahn in German; Autostrada in Italian).
main roads or highways, in a system where roads are graded A, B and sometimes lower categories
roads in a particular area or zone designated A

List of A roads
This is a list of road numbering systems which include A roads.

See also
 List of roads and highways